The North Carolina Mountain State Fair is a 10-day agricultural fair, which starts the Friday after Labor Day in Fletcher, North Carolina, and was established in 1994. The N.C. Mountain State Fair is focused the people, agriculture, art, and traditions of Western North Carolina. The fair draws about 190,000 people to the WNC Agricultural Center each year. Tickets are $9 for adults and $5 for children and senior citizens.

The COVID-19 pandemic saw the 2020 fair get cancelled.

See also

 North Carolina State Fair

References

External links

State fairs
Fairs in North America